Trawscoed railway station was located on the Carmarthen to Aberystwyth Line (originally called the Manchester and Milford Railway before being transferred to the GWR). The station had a signal box on the single platform, a weighing machine, several sidings, and a corrugated iron waiting room and ticket office combined. The estate of Trawsgoed is located nearby.

History
The station opened in August 1867 to serve Trawsgoed Estate. The station closed in December 1964 when services were truncated at Strata Florida, following flood damage to the line at Llanilar. Formal closure was confirmed two months later. In 2001 the station building and platform survived in alternative use, but collapsed in 2006.

On the night of Sunday 7 August 1955, the royal train was stabled here overnight when it was routed over the Manchester and Milford en route to the opening of an extension to the National Library of Wales on 8 August.

The station building was used as a coal merchants office after the line closed.

References
Notes

Sources

Further reading
 Holden, J.S. (1979, revised 2nd edition 2007): The Manchester & Milford Railway, Oakwood Press,

External links
 Video of Trawscoed Station
 Set of Trawscoed Station photographs
 Trawscoed Station
 Station view in 2006

Disused railway stations in Ceredigion
Former Great Western Railway stations
Beeching closures in Wales
Railway stations in Great Britain opened in 1867
Railway stations in Great Britain closed in 1964